Bobby Park may refer to:

 Bobby Park (footballer, born 1946), Scottish footballer
 Bobby Park (footballer, born 1952), Scottish footballer